The Emptiness is the third studio album by American metalcore band Alesana. It was recorded in the fall of 2009 and was released on January 26, 2010 through Fearless Records. The album is considered a rock opera due to its in-depth story. Vocalists Shawn Milke and Dennis Lee have both stated that the idea of writing an album based upon their own authored story has been present with them since the time of the band's first release, Try This with Your Eyes Closed.

Before the release of A Place Where the Sun Is Silent, The Emptiness was Alesana's best-selling album at the time, claiming the 68th position on the Billboard chart upon its release.

Background and concept
The Emptiness is the first work by Alesana to have official singles: "To Be Scared by an Owl" and "The Thespian". On November 23, after showing teaser versions of the song, the band digitally sold "To Be Scared by an Owl" on their website. The second single "The Thespian" was released two weeks later in the same fashion, shortly after the filming of its music video. "The Thespian" was released shortly afterward, on December 8. A music video for "The Thespian" was filmed during the winter of 2009 and was released on March 17, 2010.

The Emptiness became available for pre-order on iTunes on January 14 and the full album was leaked on January 21, five days before it released. It debuted at #68 on the Billboard 200 chart.

The album differs from the previous albums musically. After several lineup changes in 2009, Adam Ferguson left the band. Jake Campbell, who had temporarily replaced Shane Crump on bass guitar, joined the band as the new guitarist. Though Campbell increased the amount of dual guitars played throughout the album, he did not provide any of the vocals Ferguson previously had. However, the album features more guitar solos than their previous releases.

Although the previous albums have references to mythology of various cultures, The Emptiness is the band's first concept album. While touring in Europe, Shawn Milke and Dennis Lee decided to create a horror theme for their third album as well as using Edgar Allan Poe as an influence for their work—more specifically, the poem "Annabel Lee". Faint references are also made in the liner notes to "The Tell-Tale Heart" and "The Cask of Amontillado" in that it describes a body hidden under the bricks in the main character's basement, in comparison to the heart under the floorboards and the man behind the brick wall. In an interview, Milke included Stephen King, David Lynch, and the film Friday the 13th as further influences for the story.

The story that The Emptiness revolves around was written by Lee and Milke. It is inspired by Edgar Allan Poe's last poem "Annabel Lee". The story is said by the band to be set in the onset of the 20th century and is expounded greatly in the liner notes album. The central character of the story, a sketch artist known simply as "The Artist" wakes up one day to find his lover, Annabel, dead, lying beside him. Heartbroken and terrified, he buries her in his basement and flees. He wanders aimlessly until he comes to a tavern, where he hears the sounds of merriment and laughter. He decides that if he can't be happy no one can and slaughters everyone in the tavern. After wandering through many places and finding Annabel's killer, "The Thespian", at the end of the story The Artist finally comes face to face with him to fight to the death. He is stabbed in his side with a dagger and finds himself in a room with Annabel holding a dagger in hand. From here on the story's point of view switches from The Artist to Annabel where she explains that The Artist had slowly been sinking into madness all this while, as he became more and more withdrawn and his sketches more and more violent. Though she loved him, in the end she had to take his life in the attempt to defend herself from him.

The track listing and album artwork was released on a bulletin from Fearless Records on punknews.org, and a news post on their official site. Their tour name "You'd be Way Cuter in a Coffin" was originally the title for their first track. Two string quartet compositions by Shawn Milke ("Interlude 3" and "Interlude 4") appear after tracks 6 and 10 and are available for individual purchase on iTunes.

Story

Shawn Milke has stated that

Reception

Track listing
All lyrics written by Shawn Milke, Dennis Lee, and Patrick Thompson except where noted, all music composed by Alesana.

Personnel

Alesana
Dennis Lee – unclean vocals
Shawn Milke – lead vocals, piano, rhythm guitar 
Patrick Thompson – lead guitar, backing vocals
Jake Campbell – rhythm guitar, backing vocals, lead guitar
Shane Crump – bass, backing vocals
Jeremy Bryan – drums

Additional musicians
 Melissa Milke – female vocals
 Adam Fisher – spoken word vocals
 Julie Coleman – violin
 Wendy Goodwin – violin
 Nelly Kovalev – viola
 Ashley Peck – cello

Production
 Kris Crummett – producer
 Pat Perry – production designer
 Neil Engle – production assistant
 Toby Fraser – design
 Alan Douches – mastering

References

External links

2010 albums
Alesana albums
Fearless Records albums
Albums produced by Kris Crummett
Concept albums
Rock operas

sv:The Emptiness